Iran Fara Bourse Co. (IFB), also known as Farabourse, is an exchange for securities and other financial instruments in Tehran, Iran which operates under the official supervision of Securities and Exchange Organization (SEO).

IFB operates as a self-regulatory organization governing the activities of its brokers and members. The company was established on November 12, 2008 and its transactions officially started in four market segments on September 28, 2009. IFB provides a market for both listed and unlisted securities. Currently, there are 5 market segments, including First Market, Second Market, Third Market, Base Market, and Modern Financial Instruments Market. IFB is a member of the Federation of Euro-Asian Stock Exchanges (FEAS) in addition to the Organization of Islamic Cooperation (OIC) Member States’ Stock Exchanges Forum.

The establishment of Iran Fara Bourse Company is one of the main steps for developing the capital market in Iran and diversifying financial instruments traded in the securities market. In 2013 Farabourse started offering exchange-traded funds and real estate ETFs in September 2014. A survey based on the annual public reports and responses received from 17 exchange members showed in 2018 the trading value of the Iran Fara Bourse was roughly 18,084.88 million euros, which is the second-highest among all exchanges. There was a significant rise in trading value (equities and fixed income) of Iran Fara Bourse by about 40.5%. Market capitalization in 2018 increased compared to the indicator in 2017 by over 64%.

See also
Banking in Iran
Tehran Stock Exchange

References

External links
Iran Farabourse/official website

Stock exchanges in Iran